The 2007–08 Oakland Golden Grizzlies men's basketball team represented Oakland University in the 2007–08 college basketball season.  Oakland was coached by Greg Kampe and played their home games at the Athletics Center O'rena.  The Golden Grizzlies finished the season 17–14 overall and 11–7 in The Summit League.  Oakland advanced to the semi-finals of The Summit League tournament before falling to Indiana–Purdue Indianapolis 80–65.

Season
During the season, Oakland defeated #21 Oregon of the Pacific-10 Conference at The Palace of Auburn Hills, Mid-American Conference teams Eastern Michigan and Bowling Green at home and nearly defeated Big Ten Conference member Michigan State on the road, falling 75–71.

At the conclusion of the season, Derick Nelson was named to the all-Summit League First Team while Johnathon Jones was named to the Second Team.

Roster

Schedule

References

Oakland Golden Grizzlies
Oakland Golden Grizzlies men's basketball seasons
Oakland Golden Grizzlies men's b
Oakland Golden Grizzlies men's b